Myriam Spiteri Debono or Miriam Spiteri Debono (born 1952) is a former Speaker of the House of Representatives of Malta and first woman in the position. She also had served president of Partit Laburista's women section.

References 

Speakers of the House of Representatives of Malta
Labour Party (Malta) politicians
1952 births
Living people
20th-century Maltese women politicians
20th-century Maltese politicians